Victor Antoine Jules Cadet  (17 June 1878 – 22 September 1911) was a French water polo player and freestyle swimmer. He competed at the 1900 Summer Olympics in water polo and two swimming events and won a silver medal in the 200 m team swimming.

References

External links
 

1878 births
1911 deaths
People from Saint-Omer
French male freestyle swimmers
French male water polo players
Swimmers at the 1900 Summer Olympics
Water polo players at the 1900 Summer Olympics
Olympic swimmers of France
Olympic silver medalists for France
Olympic water polo players of France
Medalists at the 1900 Summer Olympics
Olympic silver medalists in swimming
Sportspeople from Pas-de-Calais